Josten is a German surname. Notable people with the surname include:

 Andrea Josten, finalist of Deutschland sucht den Superstar
 George Josten (born 1986), American soccer player
 Günther Josten (1921–2004), German former Luftwaffe fighter ace
 Kurt Josten (1912–1994), German-born historian of science and museum curator, largely based in England
 Otto Josten, founder of the Jostens Center in Florida, USA
 Werner Josten (1885–1963), German-born classical music composer based in the USA

Fictional characters 
 Conrad Josten, a fictional character in Smuggler comics
 Erik Josten, a former supervillain in the Marvel Comics

See also 
 Jostens, an American company providing school and college yearbooks

German-language surnames